Comin' Home  is her second release overall and first extended play from American country music artist Jessie James Decker (previously credited as Jessie James).  Released on April 18, 2014 via 19 Recordings, the album reached No. 5 on the Billboard Top Country Albums chart. On January 30, 2021 a deluxe version was released including 2 additional songs previously released as singles.  The track order also changed.

Track listing

Track listing Deluxe version

Chart performance 
Comin' Home sold 11,000 copies in its first week of release.

References 

2014 EPs
Jessie James Decker EPs
19 Recordings EPs